Men in White is a 1934 pre-Code film starring Clark Gable and Myrna Loy, and directed by Ryszard Bolesławski. The story is loosely based on the Sidney Kingsley Pulitzer-Prize-winning play of the same name. Due to suggestions of  illicit romance and abortion, the film was frequently cut. The Legion of Decency declared the movie unfit for public exhibition.

Plot
Encouraged by his mentor, the eminent Dr. Hochy Hochberg (Jean Hersholt), George Ferguson (Clark Gable), a dedicated young doctor, places his patients above everyone else in his life. However, his Social Register fiancée, Laura Hudson (Myrna Loy), grows weary of the constant interruptions and demands on his time—even cutting short  their wedding rehearsal. (The long hours and scanty pay endured not only by interns but practicing physicians is a recurrent theme in this film.)

At the end of a long, devastating day that includes the loss of a patient, George calls Laura, expecting to spend the evening with her, but she angrily tells him to leave her alone. An English student nurse, Barbara Denham (Elizabeth Allan), comes to his room to borrow some notes. They talk about how deeply the closeness of death affected them. She stays behind in his room. Some time later, Barbara is brought to the operating room for emergency surgery, presumably to deal with the results of a botched abortion. Hochy has arranged for Laura to watch George at work so she can see how important his career is. Before the anesthetist puts her under, Barbara tells George she loves him.

George plans to marry Barbara to salvage her reputation, but she develops a blood clot that will be fatal. Hochy apologizes for teaching Laura a harsher lesson than he planned, and brings her to Barbara, who tells Laura about her single encounter with George. Laura realizes that “it was that night,” the night she was not there for him. George is with Barbara when she dies. (Barbara's eyes remain open for some time after she dies, until George gently closes them.)

In the end, George will go to Europe, fulfilling Hochy's plans for his brilliant future. Laura will also go there, hoping George will find time for her.

One thread of the story involves diabetic hypoglycemia: Two doctors have a conflict at the bedside of a young girl who is desperately ill. George diagnoses (correctly) that the patient is in insulin shock (needing glucose), while the senior doctor, Dr. Cunningham—who has prescribed too much insulin—insists she is in a diabetic coma (needing insulin). George prevails and the child recovers.

Cast

Censorship 
Although there were no overt references to abortion in the original script the Hays Office found the story to be in violation of the Production Code because they believed that there were clear indications that Barbara Denham's illness was brought about by an attempted abortion. Ultimately, MGM cut some lines to accommodate their concerns. Despite these changes there were protests against the film by moral reformers and religious groups. Men in White was one of the first films condemned by the newly formed Legion of Decency.

Reception 
The film was considered a success at the box office. According to MGM records, it earned $890,000 in the US and Canada, and $565,000 elsewhere resulting in a profit of $784,000.

Radio adaptation
Men in White was presented on the Lady Esther Screen Guild Theatre on CBS on July 19, 1943. The 30-minute sanitized adaptation starred Jean Hersholt, James Craig, and Louise Allbritton.

References

External links
 
 
 
 
 Men in White at pre-code.com

1934 films
American black-and-white films
Films directed by Ryszard Bolesławski
Films set in hospitals
Medical-themed films
Metro-Goldwyn-Mayer films
1934 romantic drama films
American romantic drama films
1930s English-language films
1930s American films